The Consolidated Pastoral Company (CPC) is a large, privately owned, Australian Agrifood business which operates 8 cattle stations covering over 3.6m hectares, managing more than 300,000 cattle, in Western Australia, the Northern Territory and Queensland.  Its direct sales channels primarily involve selling cattle and beef to Asian consumer markets, domestic feedlots or processors, and exporting live cattle.

History
CPC was formed in 1983 with the purchase of various holdings in the Northern Territory, including Newcastle Waters Station, from Ashburton Pastoral Company. The Company acquired Nockatunga Station in 1990. 
Consolidated placed Isis Downs on the market in 2003 following a decision by Kerry Packer to focus on beef cattle and meat processing operations. The sale was not successful and in 2004 the company decided to remove all sheep from the  property and introduced cattle instead.

In April 2009 a majority share in CPC was acquired by private equity firm Terra Firma.

Keith Warren resigned as Chief Executive Officer of the company in 2014 citing family reasons after less than one year in the position. Troy Setter took over after joining the company only four months earlier from Australian Agricultural Company.

The company acquired Bunda Station, adjacent to Kirkimbie, in the Victoria River District in the Northern Territory for approximately 15 million in 2014. The property had been passed in at auction two years earlier for 10 million.

CPC is owned by Guy and Julia Hands through the Hands Family Office. Terra Firma (UK) (owned by Guy Hands) is the investment manager of CPC for the Hands Family Office. The Hands Family Office invests on behalf of the Hands family and has a long and successful track record of diverse investments, including forestry, renewables, real estate and hospitality. 

The strategic rationale underlying the acquisition of CPC was driven by a number of global macroeconomic themes, in particular: global population growth; a shift in Asian diet towards higher protein consumption; and limited supply of productive land. CPC has significant land and water development opportunities.

Cattle stations
 Allawah, Queensland
 Bunda, Northern Territory
 Carlton Hill, Western Australia
 Isis Downs, Queensland
 Kirkimbie, Northern Territory
 Newcastle Waters, Northern Territory
 Dungowan, Northern Territory
 Wrotham Park, Queensland

References

Agriculture companies of Australia
Food and drink companies established in 1983
Australian companies established in 1983